Marcel Wędrychowski (born 13 January 2002) is a Polish professional footballer who plays as a winger for Ekstraklasa side Pogoń Szczecin.

References

External links

2002 births
Living people
Sportspeople from Szczecin
Association football midfielders
Polish footballers
Poland youth international footballers
Poland under-21 international footballers
Pogoń Szczecin players
Górnik Łęczna players
Ekstraklasa players
III liga players